The 2018–19 Penn State Lady Lions basketball team represented Pennsylvania State University during the 2018–19 NCAA Division I women's basketball season. The Lady Lions, led by 12th-year head coach Coquese Washington, played their home games at the Bryce Jordan Center as members of the Big Ten Conference. They finished the season of 12–18, 5–13 in Big Ten play to finish in twelfth place. They lost in the first round of the Big Ten women's tournament to Wisconsin.

On March 9, Coquese Washington was fired as head coach. She finished at Penn State with a 12-year record of 209–169.

Roster

Schedule and results

|-
!colspan=9 style=| Exhibition

|-
!colspan=9 style=| Non-conference regular season

|-
!colspan=9 style=| Big Ten conference season

|-
!colspan=9 style=| Big Ten Women's Tournament

Rankings

See also
 2018–19 Penn State Nittany Lions basketball team

References

Penn State Lady Lions basketball seasons
Penn State
Penn State
Penn State